August Dickmann (January 7, 1910 - September 15, 1939) was a  Jehovah's Witness and Conscientious objector from Germany, and the first person to be executed for rejecting military service during World War Two. He was one of many German Jehovah's Witnesses executed because of his religious beliefs during the Nazi regime. Commanding the firing squad that executed Dickmann was SS officer Rudolf Höss, who later to become the longest-serving commandant of Auschwitz concentration and extermination camp.

References

Further reading
Detlef Garbe (2008). Between Resistance and Martyrdom: Jehovah's Witnesses in the Third Reich, The University of Wisconsin Press, pp. 415–416. ISBN 9780299207946

1910 births
1939 deaths